977 is a 2006 Russian sci-fi drama film directed by Nikolay Khomeriki. It was screened in the Un Certain Regard section at the 2006 Cannes Film Festival, and was the only Russian film to show that year at the festival.

Cast

References

External links

2006 films
2000s science fiction drama films
2000s Russian-language films
Films directed by Nikolay Khomeriki
Russian science fiction drama films